The 2018 Howard Bison football team represented Howard University in the 2018 NCAA Division I FCS football season. They were led by second-year head coach Mike London. The Bison played their home games at William H. Greene Stadium. They were a member of the Mid-Eastern Athletic Conference (MEAC). They finished the season 4–6, 4–3 in MEAC play to finish in a tie for fourth place.

On November 19, head coach Mike London resigned to become the head coach at William & Mary. He finished at Howard with a two-year record of 11–10.

Previous season
The Bison kicked off the 2017 season by defeating UNLV, a 45-point favorite, in the biggest upset in college football history by point spread. They would finish the season 7–4, 6–2 in MEAC play to finish in a tie for second place.

Preseason

MEAC preseason poll
In a vote of the MEAC head coaches and sports information directors, the Bison were picked to finish in second place.

Preseason All-MEAC Teams
The Bison had nine players at ten positions selected to the preseason all-MEAC teams.

Offense

1st team

Jequez Ezzard – WR

James Homon – C

Tyrone Ramsey – OL

2nd team

Caylin Newton – QB

Kyle Anthony – WR

Defense

2nd team

Marcellus Allison – LB

Bryan Cook –  DB

3rd team

Aaron Motley – DL

Special teams

2nd team

Jaquez Ezzard – RS

3rd team

Dakota Lebofsky – K

Schedule

 Source: Schedule

Despite also being a member of the MEAC, the game vs Savannah State will be considered a non-conference game and will have no effect on the MEAC standings.

Game summaries

at Ohio

at Kent State

vs Bethune–Cookman

at North Carolina Central

Delaware State

at Morgan State

South Carolina State

Florida A&M

at Norfolk State

Bryant

Coaching staff

References

Howard
Howard Bison football seasons
Howard Bison football